Conus duffyi is a species of sea snail, a marine gastropod mollusk in the family Conidae, the cone snails and their allies.

Like all species within the genus Conus, these snails are predatory and venomous. They are capable of "stinging" humans, therefore live ones should be handled carefully or not at all.

Distribution
This species occurs in the Caribbean Sea and off the Antilles.

Description 
The maximum recorded shell length is 42 mm.

Habitat 
The average recorded depth of Conus duffyi is 2 meters.

References 

 Tucker J.K. & Tenorio M.J. (2009) Systematic classification of Recent and fossil conoidean gastropods. Hackenheim: Conchbooks. 296 pp.
 Puillandre N., Duda T.F., Meyer C., Olivera B.M. & Bouchet P. (2015). One, four or 100 genera? A new classification of the cone snails. Journal of Molluscan Studies. 81: 1–23

External links 
 The Conus Biodiversity website
 Cone Shells – Knights of the Sea
 

duffyi
Gastropods described in 1992